O 22, laid down K XXII was an  of the Royal Netherlands Navy that saw service during World War II.

Ship history

The submarine was ordered on 12 April 1937 and laid down on 20 November 1937 as K XXII at the Koninklijke Maatschappij De Schelde, Vlissingen. During construction she was renamed O 22, and was finally launched on 20 January 1940. Following the German invasion of 10 May 1940,  O 22 was hastily commissioned, still incomplete, and sailed for England on 12 May together with her sister  and the tugboat B.V. 37, to be finally completed at the Navy yard in Rosyth.

During the war she operated in the North Sea and made five patrols. During her last patrol O 22 was lost with her entire crew, 42 Dutch and 3 British sailors. Her wreck was discovered in 1993 by a ship of the Norwegian Petroleum Directorate. On 2 November 1996 a ceremony at the wreck site was held to commemorate the loss.

References

1940 ships
Ships built in Vlissingen
World War II shipwrecks in the North Sea
World War II submarines of the Netherlands
Lost submarines of the Netherlands
O 21-class submarines
Maritime incidents in November 1940
Warships lost with all hands
Submarines built by Koninklijke Maatschappij De Schelde